Turbojugend, sometimes shortened to TJ, is the international fan club of the Norwegian deathpunk band Turbonegro. A Turbojugend member can be recognised by their specially-made denim jackets with the Turbonegro logo and "Turbojugend [name of chapter]" stitched on the back. The logo of Turbojugend Oslo can be found on almost every album Turbonegro has made. There are more than 2300 chapters worldwide.

Origins 
Turbonegro guitarist Euroboy explained the club's origin: "We thought about how Kiss had the Kiss Army so we thought that Turbonegro should have our own Navy. It started as a joke in Happy-Tom's apartment in 1995. We put his address on the album sleeves and it was all just for laughs. The Jugend blossomed into something way bigger than we ever expected." When you sent in a letter/application you would receive a diploma to prove that you were a member of Turbojugend.

Happy Tom has implied that the band have a complicated relationship with the Turbojugend: 'It's a kind of fearful and hostile relationship we have with them... I think if we put out a bad record we'd probably get beaten up. The Turbojugend are starting to remind me quite a lot of the Manson Family - except they do beer and speed instead of LSD and they haven't killed anyone... yet!'

Ever since its initial foundation, Turbojugend has more and more become a movement independent of the band itself. According to a poll on a TJ-website, a majority of members would choose the Jugend, if they had to decide between band and TJ.

The jackets 
The jacket, commonly known as a "Kutte", first appeared in the late '90s. Bitzcore Records customized Levi jackets by embroidering the "Turbojugend Oslo" logo on them, but eventually changed Oslo to St. Pauli.

The jackets became so sought-after that Bitzcore Records-run Turbonegro Mailorder started ordering Levi jackets from the factory with "Turbojugend Oslo" already embroidered on them. These jackets were available for a couple of years but do not hold the same status as the originals, which were locally created in very limited numbers. Eventually, Turbonegro Mailorder made it possible to buy jackets with the names of other chapter cities on them; this is how Turbojugend Worldwide was started.

Members who travel around the world frequently trade patches or buttons with chapter members in different countries, to place them on their own jackets. This is usually a good way to spot well-travelled members, but internet trading does occur and some still prefer a jacket with few to no other patches or buttons.

Welt-Turbojugend-Tage 

Once a year, Turbojugends from all over the world meet in St. Pauli, Hamburg, Germany to celebrate Turbonegro themselves as well as punk rock in general. This two-day event is called Welt-Turbojugend-Tage ("World Turbojugend Days") with concerts and meetings in different clubs. In 2011 the 7th edition of WTJT was held featuring the comeback of Turbonegro, with Duke of Nothing on vocals.

In addition to the Welt-Turbojugend-Tage in Hamburg, in recent years, the Punk Rock Bowling festival in Las Vegas has served as meeting point for Turbojugend chapters Worldwide. Each year, several hundred members can be encountered there.

Bands 
Even though Turbojugend is the fan club of Turbonegro, Turbojugend has also taken a shine to other rock bands as well. Some of these bands are:
 The Dogs
 Silver (former band of Turbonegro drummer Tommy Manboy)
 Brainerd
 Peter Pan Speedrock
 The Turbo A.C.'s
 Trashcan Darlings
 The Dukes of Nothing (former band of Turbonegro vocalist Tony Sylvester)
 Valient Thorr

Leadership 
When Turbojugend was first started by the band (Turbonegro), there was no clear leader, instead it was intended to be a flat-structured entity based on the principles of classic anarchist thought. In the late 1990s Bitzcore Records starting taking over and began to produce the jackets as a merchandising venture, with the owners of Bitzcore assuming the leadership role, using names such as "El Presidente" and "Il Consiglieri". However, in 2012 the band regained ownership and handed the leadership over to two groups. These groups were the Turbojugend Amb-ASS-adors and Jugendwart, both groups put together of well experienced members.

Turbojugend Oslo 
Turbojugend Oslo is what many believe to be the biggest Turbojugend chapter in the world, along with Turbojugend St. Pauli.

See also 
Aero Force One
Blue Army
Kiss Army

References

Further reading

External links 
Turbojugend official website
Turbojugend World forum

Music fan clubs
Turbonegro